"What Cha Gonna Do with My Lovin'" is a song by American singer and songwriter Stephanie Mills, released in July 1979 as the first single from the album of the same name (1979). It became a hit, reaching No. 22 on the US Billboard Hot 100. It was also a top 10 hit on the Billboard R&B chart, as well as a minor hit in Canada.

Charts

Inner City version
In 1989,  the song was recorded by American dance group Inner City. It was the group's fifth single and their fifth consecutive UK top 20 hit, reaching No. 12. Along with "Good Life", this is the only other Inner City song to make the Billboard Hot 100 chart, peaking at No. 76. While all the group's previous singles had topped the Hot Dance Music/Club Play chart in the US, this was the first not to do so, although it still reached No. 8.

Critical reception
David Stubbs from Melody Maker wrote about the song, "A bit subdued, a bit derivative, a bit like Chaka Kahn feeling a bit faint after a month on the Cambridge diet."	Ian McCann from NME felt it "is the usual Kevin Saunderson sound slowed down 15 beats a minute. Paris is in her usual seductive self, but can Inner City hit with an Mtume song at his slack tempo and not theirs?" Chris Heath from Smash Hits remarked that the song "is quite different" from their earlier singles, "and is much more subtle, a bit like Soul II Soul in fact."

Charts

References

Stephanie Mills songs
1979 songs
1979 singles
1989 singles
Inner City (band) songs
Songs written by Reggie Lucas
20th Century Fox Records singles
Songs written by James Mtume
Virgin Records singles